Akinwumi "Akin" Adesina is a Nigerian economist, who is currently serving as the President of the African Development Bank. He previously served as Nigeria's Minister of Agriculture and Rural Development. Until his appointment as Minister in 2010, he was Vice President of Policy and Partnerships for the Alliance for a Green Revolution in Africa (AGRA). He was elected as the President of the African Development Bank in 2015 and re-elected for a second term in 2020. He is the first Nigerian to hold the post.

Early life and education 
Adesina was born to a Nigerian farmer in Ibadan, Oyo state. He attended a village school and had a Bachelor's degree in Agricultural Economics with First Class Honors from the University of Ife (now Obafemi Awolowo University), Nigeria in 1981. He was the first student to be awarded this distinction by the university. He pursued further studies at Purdue University, Indiana and briefly returned to Nigeria in 1984, to get married. He obtained his Ph.D. in Agricultural Economics in 1988 from Purdue, where he won the outstanding Ph.D. thesis for his research work.

Career
From 1990 to 1995, Adesina served as a senior economist at West African Rice Development Association (WARDA) in Bouaké, Ivory Coast. He worked at the Rockefeller Foundation since winning a fellowship from the foundation as a senior scientist in 1988. From 1999 to 2003, he was the representative of the Foundation for the Southern African area. From 2003 to 2008, he was an associate director for food security.

Adesina was the Nigerian Agriculture Minister from 2010 to 2015. Adesina was named Forbes African Man of the Year, for his reform of Nigerian agriculture. He introduced more transparency into the fertiliser supply chain. He also said that he would give away mobile phones to farmers, but this proved too difficult. One of the reasons was lack of a mobile network in country areas.

In 2010, United Nations Secretary General, Ban Ki-moon, appointed him as one of 17 global leaders, to spearhead the Millennium Development Goals.

On 28 May 2015, Adesina was elected the presumptive President of the African Development Bank. He began his tenure of the office on 1 September 2015.

In September 2016, Adesina was appointed by United Nations Secretary-General, Ban Ki-moon, to serve as member of the Lead Group of the Scaling Up Nutrition Movement. In 2017, he was awarded 2017 World Food Prize.

On 27 August 2020, Adesina was re-elected as President of the Africa Development Bank for a second term of five years.

Personal life
While at Purdue University, Adesina and his wife, along with another couple, started a Christian group called the African Student Fellowship.
He and his wife, Grace, have two children, Rotimi and Segun.

Recognition
 Adesina was cited as one of the Top 100 most influential Africans by New African magazine in 2015.
In 2013, he was named as Forbes Africa Person of the Year.
 In 2018, he was awarded an Honorary Doctor by Afe Babalola University.
In 2019, he was again named as the Forbes Africa Person of the Year.
 On January 28, 2020, he was awarded Honorary Doctor of Science by the Federal University Of Agriculture, Abeokuta, Nigeria.
 On May 14, 2022, he was awarded Honorary Doctor  by Addis Ababa University, Ethiopia, for his contributions to the field of economics.

Honours 
 2019 : Grand Officer of the National Order of Merit of Tunisia.

References

Living people
Nigerian civil servants
Purdue University College of Agriculture alumni
Obafemi Awolowo University alumni
Place of birth missing (living people)
People from Ogun State
Nigerian agriculturalists
Nigerian politicians
1960 births
Nigerian chief executives
Nigerian bankers
Agriculture and food award winners